Censor is a 2001 Indian Hindi-language drama film directed and produced by Dev Anand. It stars himself, Hema Malini, Jackie Shroff, Shammi Kapoor and Rekha. The film satirises film censorship in India. It was the first and only film to star veteran actors Dev Anand and Shammi Kapoor together onscreen.

Plot
Under the directions of the Minister for Information and Broadcasting, the Indian Censor Board prepares a list of cuts for the Bollywood film producer Vikramjeet's new movie Aane Wala Kal. Vikramjeet is unhappy and decides to meet the minister himself to appeal against these cuts, only to find that the minister favours even more cuts. Vikramjeet shows the movie in a private theatre to an audience from all walks of life, takes their written opinion and smuggles a copy to America, just in time to ensure that it is nominated for an Oscar. This is where Vikramjeet's troubles start as the Censor Board refuses to grant a U certificate. He is arrested for smuggling the movie without permission from the Reserve Bank of India. The only way he can escape the wrath of the authorities is by getting some fans and stars of his movie to gather some dirt on the Censor Board members and to expose them publicly.

Cast
 Dev Anand as Vikramjeet "Vicky"
 Jackie Shroff as Naseeruddin Shaikh 
 Hema Malini as Radha 
 Rekha as Ms. Shrivastav
 Ayesha Jhulka as Shakeela Banu
 Mamta Kulkarni as Nisha 
 Johnny Lever as Johny
 Shammi Kapoor as Judge
 Raj Babbar
 Aruna Irani as Nandini
 Amrish Puri as Pandit Shiv Prasad 
 Vinay Anand as Hero 
 Govinda as himself (special appearance in song "Hum Jo Rang Mein Aa Gaye")
 Pinky Campbell as Mohini Shiv Prasad

Soundtrack
Lyrics by Vinod Mahendra and Gopaldas Neeraj.

References

External links

2000s Hindi-language films
2001 films
Films directed by Dev Anand
Films scored by Jatin–Lalit
Indian satirical films
Indian drama films
Indian courtroom films
Censorship in India
2000s satirical films
Hindi-language drama films